Owen Hughes may refer to:

 Owen Hughes (politician) (1848–1932), judge and politician in the Northwest Territories
 Owen Hughes (canoeist) (born 1971), New Zealand slalom canoer
 Owen Hughes (cricketer) (1889–1972), English cricketer and military officer
 Owen Hughes (EastEnders), fictional character